The men's 500 metres speed skating competition of the 2018 Winter Olympics was held on 19 February 2018 at Gangneung Oval in Gangneung

Competition schedule
All times are Korea Standard Time (UTC+9).

Records
Prior to this competition, the existing world, Olympic and track records were as follows.

The following records were set during this competition.

OR = Olympic record, TR = track record

Results
The race was started at 20:53.

References

Men's speed skating at the 2018 Winter Olympics